Euodynerus foraminatus is a species of potter or mason wasp in the family Vespidae. It is notable as a hymenopteran with fertile diploid males.

References

Further reading

 

Potter wasps
Insects described in 1853